This is a list of Australian television related events, debuts, finales, and cancellations that are scheduled to occur in 2016, the 61st year of continuous operation of television in Australia.

Events

January

February

March

April

May

June

July

August

September

October

November

December

Television channels

New channels
19 January – Sky News Business HD (high definition simulcast of Sky News Business)
28 February – 7flix
1 March — WIN HD (high definition simulcast of WIN)
2 March – Ten HD (high definition simulcast of Ten)
25 March – [V] Hits +2
1 April – Comedy Central
1 April – Sky Thoroughbred Central HD (high definition simulcast of Sky Thoroughbred Central)
1 May – Sky News Election Channel
10 May – 7HD (high definition simulcast of Seven in Melbourne and Adelaide, 7mate in other markets)
14 May – beIN Sports 1 HD (high definition simulcast of beIN Sports 1), beIN Sports 2, beIN Sports 2 HD (high definition simulcast of beIN Sports 2), beIN Sports 3, beIN Sports 3 HD (high definition simulcast of beIN Sports 3)
15 May – Sky News Election HD (high definition simulcast of Sky News Election Channel)
1 July – Foxtel Movies More, Foxtel Movies More HD (high definition simulcast of Foxtel Movies More), MUTV, MUTV HD (high definition simulcast of MUTV), Chelsea TV, Chelsea TV HD (high definition simulcast of Chelsea TV), LFC TV, LFC TV HD (high definition simulcast of LFC TV), Spike
24 July – Hillsong Channel
5 October – Binge, A&E + 2 (2 hour timeshift channel of A&E)
13 October – SonLife

Channel closures
25 March – Channel [V]
1 April – MTV Classic
30 April – 4ME
4 October – SoHo

Affiliation changes

 1 July – Nine Network programming to air on the current Southern Cross Ten regional network in Queensland, Southern NSW and Victoria, joining existing South Australian services. Nine programming on Southern Cross will be branded with Nine's mainstream branding.
 1 July – Network Ten programming to air on the current WIN Television regional network in Queensland, Southern NSW, Victoria, Mildura, Tasmania, Western Australia and Griffith.

Celebrity deaths

Premieres

Domestic series

International series

Telemovies and miniseries

Documentaries

Specials

Programming changes

Changes to network affiliation 
Criterion for inclusion in the following list is that Australian premiere episodes will air in Australia for the first time on a new channel. This includes when a program is moved from a free-to-air network's primary channel to a digital multi-channel, as well as when a program moves between subscription television channels – provided the preceding criterion is met. Ended television series which change networks for repeat broadcasts are not included in the list.

Free-to-air premieres
This is a list of programs which made their premiere on Australian free-to-air television that had previously premiered on Australian subscription television. Programs may still air on the original subscription television network.

Subscription premieres
This is a list of programs which made their debut on Australian subscription television, having previously premiered on Australian free-to-air television. Programs may still air (first or repeat) on the original free-to-air television network.

Returning programs 
Australian produced programs which are returning with a new season after being absent from television from the previous calendar year.

Endings

See also 
 2016 in Australia
 List of Australian films of 2016

References